Sergio Arturo Perez Hechavarria (born 26 December 1968) is a Cuban Paralympic judoka. 
In 2000 he won the gold medal in the men's 60kg. He won another gold medal in 2004 but was stripped of the medal for doping.

References

Living people
1968 births
Paralympic judoka of Cuba
Judoka at the 2000 Summer Paralympics
Judoka at the 2004 Summer Paralympics
Judoka at the 2008 Summer Paralympics
Paralympic gold medalists for Cuba
Cuban male judoka
Medalists at the 2000 Summer Paralympics
Paralympic medalists in judo
Medalists at the 2011 Parapan American Games
Doping cases in judo
20th-century Cuban people
21st-century Cuban people